Real Love may refer to:

Film and television
 Real Love (film), a film by Claire Burger

Music

Albums 
 Real Love (Derek Johnson album)
 Real Love (Dolly Parton album), or the title song (see below)
 Real Love (Lisa Stansfield album)
 Real Love (Oh My Girl album)
 Real Love (Sarah Connor album)
 Real Love (Swans album)

Songs 
 "Real Love" (Beatles song), written and first performed by John Lennon
 "Real Love" (Clean Bandit and Jess Glynne song)
 "Real Love" (Dolly Parton and Kenny Rogers song)
 "Real Love" (Doobie Brothers song)
 "Real Love" (Jody Watley song)
 "Real Love" (Lee Ryan song)
 "Real Love" (Lucinda Williams song)
 "Real Love" (Mary J. Blige song)
 "Real Love" (Sarah Connor song)
 "Real Love" (Skyy song)
 "Real Love" (The Time Frequency song)
 "Real Love", by Berryz Kobo from 5
 "Real Love", by Deborah Cooper
 "Real Love", by Dijon Prioleau from A Kid's Point of View
 "Real Love", by Hillsong Young and Free from their album Youth Revival
 "Real Love", by Lakeside
 "Real Love", by Lebanese Canadian singer Massari from his 2005 self-titled album Massari
 "Real Love", by The Smashing Pumpkins from Machina II/The Friends & Enemies of Modern Music
 "Real Love", by Carly Rae Jepsen from Dedicated
 "Real Love", by Stephanie Mills from Home
 "Real Love", by Yes from Talk
 "Real Love", by Beach House from Teen Dream

See also
 Amor real, a Mexican telenovela